Willem de Vries Lentsch (10 September 1886, Nieuwendam, North Holland – 6 March 1980, Amsterdam) was a sailor from the Netherlands, who represented his native country at the 1928 Summer Olympics in Amsterdam in the 12' Dinghy. In 1936, with Bob Maas as helmsmen, De Vries Lentsch took part in the Dutch Star BEM II and took the Bronze.

Willem de Vries Lentsch is the younger brother of Gerard de Vries Lentsch and the father of Wim de Vries Lentsch.

Sources
 
 
 
 
 
 

1886 births
1980 deaths
Sportspeople from Amsterdam
Dutch male sailors (sport)
Sailors at the 1928 Summer Olympics – 12' Dinghy
Sailors at the 1936 Summer Olympics – Star
Olympic sailors of the Netherlands
Medalists at the 1936 Summer Olympics
Olympic medalists in sailing
Olympic bronze medalists for the Netherlands